Riverfront Parkway is located along the Mississippi River in the cities of Davenport and Bettendorf in the U.S. state of Iowa. The parkway is a bike and walking trail that extends for  starting at Credit Island on the west passing through Davenport for  before entering Bettendorf. It continues for another  at its terminus on the east side of Bettendorf. On its way east from Credit Island it passes through Veterans Memorial Park, which is being developed, Centennial Park, LeClaire Park, River Heritage Park that is being developed on the east side of downtown Davenport, and Lindsay Park. In Bettendorf it passes through Leach Park. There are plans to connect the park to the Duck Creek Parkway and Sunderbruch Park in the future. There are public art installations along the parkway at Credit Island, Lindsay Park and Leach Park.

References

Quad Cities
Bettendorf, Iowa
Parks in Davenport, Iowa
Protected areas on the Mississippi River
Sports venues in the Quad Cities
Transportation in Davenport, Iowa
Transportation in Scott County, Iowa